Scum is the third studio album by English punk rock band the Anti-Nowhere League and the first album of new material released since the original band's breakup ten years previously. A new lineup is featured, with only lead singer Animal and guitarist Magoo remaining from the band which recorded the much-criticised The Perfect Crime LP in 1987. The album also marks a return to the ANL's "classic" punk-metal sound.

Track listing
All songs written by Animal/Magoo, except where noted.

"Fucked Up and Wasted"
"Chocolate Soldiers"
"Get Ready"
"Suicide...Have You Tried?"
"Pig Iron"
"Scum"
"Burn 'Em All"
"Gypsies, Tramps and Thieves" (Robert Stone)
"How Does It Feel?"
"The Great Unwashed"
"...Long Live Punk..."

Personnel
Animal - vocals
Magoo - rhythm guitar
Beef - lead guitar
JJ Kaos - bass guitar
Revvin Taylor - drums

Anti-Nowhere League albums
1997 albums
Impact Records albums